Catocala jyoka is a moth in the family Erebidae. It is found in China in the province of Sichuan.

References

jyoka
Moths described in 2006
Moths of Asia